Phoxinellus pseudalepidotus is a species of ray-finned fish in the family Cyprinidae.
It is found only in Bosnia and Herzegovina.
Its natural habitat is rivers.
It is threatened by habitat loss.

References

Phoxinellus
Fish described in 2003
Taxonomy articles created by Polbot